Macute is a village in Croatia, in the municipality of Voćin, Virovitica-Podravina County. It is connected by the D69 highway.

Demographics
According to the 2011 census, the village of Macute has 33 inhabitants. This represents 11.54% of its pre-war population according to the 1991 census.

The 1991 census recorded that 97.20% of the village population were ethnic Serbs (278/286), 2.10% were ethnic Croats (6/286), 0.35% were Yugoslavs (1/286) and 0.35% were of other ethnic origin (1/286).

References 

Municipalities of Croatia
Slavonia
Serb communities in Croatia
Populated places in Virovitica-Podravina County